The Tiger of Circus Farini (German: Der Tiger des Zirkus Farini) is a 1923 German silent film directed by Uwe Jens Krafft and starring Helena Makowska, Arnold Korff and Elsie Fuller.

The film's art direction was by Fritz Kraenke.

Cast

References

External links

1923 films
Films of the Weimar Republic
Films directed by Uwe Jens Krafft
German silent feature films
UFA GmbH films
Circus films
German black-and-white films